Corus International is a global non-governmental humanitarian organization headquartered in Baltimore, Maryland.

History 
Corus International was launched on January 1, 2020, by international NGOs Lutheran World Relief and IMA World Health as a parent organization of a family of for-profit and nonprofit faith-based subsidiaries addressing global health and development. The founding of Corus followed the operational merger of Lutheran World Relief and IMA World Health in January 2019.

References

External links
Official Site
LWR Farmers Market Coffee
IMA World Health
CGA Technologies
Ground Up Investing LLC
LWR Farmers Market Coffee
Social welfare charities based in the United States
International development agencies
Humanitarian aid organizations
Non-profit organizations based in Maryland